The Boss is a 1915 silent film produced by William A. Brady and released through his World Film Company. The film is based on a 1911 play by Edward Sheldon called The Boss. On stage it starred Holbrook Blinn and Emily Stevens. In this silent version Holbrook Blinn reprises his role from the Broadway play but Emily Stevens is replaced by Alice Brady, the daughter of producer William Brady.  The Boss is considered a lost film.

Plot

Cast
Holbrook Blinn – Michael R. Regan
Alice Brady – Emily Griswold
William Marion – Archbishop Sullivan
Charles S. Abbe – James D. Griswold
Bert Starkey – Porkey McCoy
Frederick Truesdell – Scanlan
Julia Stuart – Mrs. Regan
Douglas MacLean – Regan's Secretary, Robert (*as Douglas McLean)
R. B. Mantell Jr. – Regan's Butler, Gates

References

External links

1915 films
American silent feature films
American films based on plays
Films based on works by Edward Sheldon
Lost American films
Films directed by Emile Chautard
1915 drama films
Silent American drama films
American black-and-white films
World Film Company films
1915 lost films
Lost drama films
1910s American films